Tell Your Friends is an album by American jazz fusion group Snarky Puppy that was released in 2010.

Track listing

The album was scheduled to be released on vinyl in 2020. It was discovered that the original mix was absent from the hard drive where it was supposed to be stored. Thus, the entire album was remixed and remastered, with two additional tracks included.

Personnel
Source: 
Michael League –  bass guitar, keybass
Jay Jennings – trumpet, flugelhorn
Mike Maher – trumpet
Chris Bullock – tenor saxophone
Ian Rapien – tenor saxophone
Zach Brock – violin
Eylem Basildi – violin
Roni Gan – violin (Track 5)
Shawna Hamilton – cello
Bill Laurance – piano, keyboards
Shaun Martin – keyboards
Justin Stanton – keyboards
Bob Lanzetti – electric guitar
Mark Lettieri – electric guitar
Chris McQueen – electric & acoustic guitars
Robert "Sput" Searight – drums
Nate Werth – percussion
Taron Lockett – drums (Tracks 1 & 3)

References

2010 albums
Snarky Puppy albums